Like their American counterparts, a significant number of Canadians live and work in Hong Kong. In February 2011 research from the Asia Pacific Foundation, conducted with Hong Kong Baptist University, suggests there are at least 295,000 Canadians in Hong Kong, which is more than the population of places like Regina or Saskatoon. Near 85% of Canadians in Hong Kong are Canadian-born, a figure higher than in Canada itself (80.2%). This represents the third largest community of Canadians, after Canada itself and the United States. A large portion of these are ethnic Chinese.

The government of Hong Kong does not recognise dual nationals originally from Hong Kong as Canadian citizens, so that government circa 2014 counted about 16,000 Canadians in Hong Kong, while the Consulate-General of Canada in Hong Kong counted 300,000 Canadians.

Diplomatic missions
The Consulate General of Canada in Hong Kong and Macao serves Canadians in Hong Kong.

Education

The Canadian International School of Hong Kong serves Canadians in Hong Kong.

People
 Adderly Fong, race car driver
 Aimee Chan, actress
 Allan Zeman, businessman and "father of Lan Kwai Fong"
 Bernice Liu, actress
 Charlene Choi, singer in the singing duo Twins
 Cordia Tsoi, Olympian
 Doreen Steidle
 Cissy Wang, fashion model
 Edison Chen, singer and actor
 Eliza Sam, actress and model
 Fred Cheng, singer and actor
 Grace Chan, actress 
 Jade Kwan, singer; her parents live in Vancouver.
 Jay Fung, singer, songwriter 
 Jeanie Chan, actress and model 
 Joyce Cheng, actress; daughter of Lydia Shum
 Karena Lam, actress 
 Kelvin Kwan, singer
 Lap-Chee Tsui, former chancellor of the University of Hong Kong
 Lawrence Chou, singer
 Linda Chung, actress
 Lydia Shum, actress
MC Cheung, singer
 Nicholas Tse, actor; son of Patrick Tse Yin
 Otto Poon Lok-to, Husband of Teresa Cheng, the Secretary for Justice of Hong Kong
 Patrick Tse Yin, actor
 Phil Lam, singer, songwriter 
 Sally Yeh, singer
 Samantha Lam, Olympian
 Sammy Sum, singer and actor
 Sonija Kwok, actress 
 Susanna Kwan, actress and singer

Canadian legacy in Hong Kong 

A few of places in Hong Kong are or were named for Canadians who have lived or served in various capacities in Hong Kong.

 Osborn Barracks - now PLA East Kowloon Barracks and named for Sgt Maj. John Robert Osborn, a Canadian Army personnel who died in the defence of Hong Kong in 1941. A statue of Osborn now resides in Hong Kong Park.
 Tiu Keng Leng - once called Rennie's Mill, named for Canadian businessman and founder of  Hong Kong Milling Company Alfred Herbert Rennie.
 Macpherson Stadium, Hong Kong (as well as McPherson Playground, MacPherson Place) - named for Canadian missionary John Livingstone McPherson who worked for the YMCA in Hong Kong from 1905 to 1935.

See also 

 Hong Kong Canadian

References

External links
 Canadians in Hong Kong - Veterans Affairs Canada
 nytimes.com - "For Many From Hong Kong, Vancouver Is a Way Station"
 The Canadian Chamber of Commerce in Hong Kong - the largest Canadian chamber outside Canada
 asiapacific.ca - "Close to 300,000 Canadian Citizens Estimated to be Living in Hong Kong"

+
 
Ethnic groups in Hong Kong